"Coco Jamboo" is a song by German Eurodance group Mr. President. It was released on 29 March 1996 as the lead single from their second studio album, We See the Same Sun (1996). Music critics compared the song to Swedish band Ace of Base. A massive hit in Europe, it reached number one in countries like Austria, the Czech Republic, Hungary, Sweden, and Switzerland. It also enjoyed success in the United States, peaking at number 21 on the Billboard Hot 100 in September 1997, as their only single to chart on that chart. The accompanying music video was filmed in Venezuela. Mr. President was awarded the German 1997 Echo award in the category for Best Dance Single with "Coco Jamboo".

Critical reception
Scottish newspaper Aberdeen Evening Express described "Coco Jamboo" as "Ace of Base-style Euro-pop that has already done the business on the continent." Larry Flick from Billboard wrote that "once again, the European dance scene spawns a potential stateside smash. With its balmy bassline and spirited chorus, this single offers a way-familiar (but quite pleasant) pop/dancehall sound à la Ace of Base, but with a rugged hip-hop edge. The blend of wispy female vocals and throaty male rapping contributes to making this an easy programming bet."

A reviewer from Daily Record called it an "anonymous club 18 to 30s style anthem [that is] enjoying predictable summer success." Music Week rated the song four out of five, adding, "We've loved this Ace Of Base-style summertime nursery rhyme ever since we heard it in Germany. It's unashamedly mainstream and is a guaranteed hit — if that is, radio can forget its current dislike of mainstream pop." Polish magazine Porcys listed "Coco Jamboo" at number 100 in their ranking of "100 Singles 1990–1999". They said, "Of course, summer is a season of banalities, but beautiful and joyful, and one of the functions of popular music is to enrich our gray lives with beauty and joy."

Chart performance
"Coco Jamboo" went on to become a huge hit all over Europe, peaking at number-one in Austria, Czech Republic, Hungary, Sweden and Switzerland. It also was a top 5 hit in Denmark, Finland (three), Germany (two), Ireland (three), the Netherlands (two), Norway (two), as well as on the Eurochart Hot 100, where the single reached number four in July 1996. In the UK, it peaked at number eight in June 1997, in its second run on the UK Singles Chart. The song spent two weeks at that position. It first time peaked at number 87 in December 1996. Outside Europe, "Coco Jamboo" was successful in both Australia and New Zealand, where it reached number seven and nine. And on the US Billboard Hot 100, it peaked at number 21 as the only song by the band to reach that chart. On the Billboard Dance Club Songs chart, it reached number 17. The single was awarded with a gold record in Austria, New Zealand, Sweden and Switzerland. It also earned a silver record in the UK and a platinum record in Australia, Germany and Norway.

Music video
The song's accompanying music video, released in April 1996, was directed by John Buche. It features the band's members walking on a beach and performing the song. It was filmed in Carúpano, a small city located in the Venezuelan coasts. The video specifically shows Playa Medina and Plaza Santa Rosa, two touristic places in Carúpano, and also part of the Carnival of Carúpano, one of the most iconic Carnivals in Venezuela. Buche would go on directing the videos for the group's next singles, "I Give You My Heart" and "Show Me the Way".

Track listings

 7" single – US (1996)
A. "Coco Jamboo" (Radio Edit) - 3:38
B. "Coco Jamboo" (C.C.'s R&B Mix) - 4:16

 12" – Germany (1996)
A1. "Coco Jamboo" (Extended Version) - 5:42
A2. "Coco Jamboo" (Groove Version) - 6:02
A3. "Coco Jamboo" (Put It On Another Version) - 3:17
B1. "Coco Jamboo" (Mousse T.'s Extended Club Mix) - 6:15
B2. "Coco Jamboo" (Mousse T.'s Dangerous Dub) - 6:17
B3. "Coco Jamboo" (Mousse T.'s Instrumental Club Mix) - 6:15

 CD single – Europe (1996)
 "Coco Jamboo" (Radio Version) - 3:37
 "Coco Jamboo" (Extended Version) - 5:42

 CD single – US (1996)
"Coco Jamboo" (Radio Edit) - 3:38
"Coco Jamboo" (C.C.'s R&B Mix) - 4:16

 CD maxi – Europe (1996)
"Coco Jamboo" (Radio Version) - 3:37
"Coco Jamboo" (Extended Version) - 5:42
"Coco Jamboo" (Groove Version) - 6:02
"Coco Jamboo" (Mousse T.'s Club Mix - Radio Edit) - 3:10
"Coco Jamboo" (Mousse T.'s Extended Club Mix) - 6:15
"Coco Jamboo" (Mousse T.'s Dangerous Dub) - 6:17
"Coco Jamboo" (Instrumental Version) - 3:33
"Coco Jamboo" (Put In On Another Version) - 3:17

 CD maxi Remixes – Europe (1996)
"Coco Jamboo" (C. C.'s R & B Mix) - 4:14
"Coco Jamboo" (Chico Y Chico Tribal Radio Mix) - 3:42
"Coco Jamboo" (Candy Club Remix) - 5:46
"Coco Jamboo" (Candy Club's Ragga Jump) - 5:03
"Coco Jamboo" (Chico Y Chico Tribal Remix) - 6:36
"Coco Jamboo" (Original Radio Version) - 3:38

Charts and sales

Weekly charts

Year-end charts

Certifications and sales

Release history

Christmas version
During the 1996 holiday season, a Christmas-themed version of "Coco Jamboo" was released by the band, featuring new lyrics and festive instruments. It is currently viewable on YouTube.

Cover versions
Romanian performer Inna recorded a song called "Rendez Vous" for her fourth studio album, Inna (2015), which samples elements from the recording.

Israeli singer Netta Barzilai  performed a cover of the song for the first episode of her YouTube show Netta's Office.

References

External links
 Coco Jamboo at Facebook

1996 singles
1996 songs
English-language German songs
Mr. President (band) songs
Number-one singles in Austria
Number-one singles in the Czech Republic
Number-one singles in Hungary
Number-one singles in Sweden
Number-one singles in Switzerland
Reggae fusion songs
Warner Records singles